FGO may refer to:

Fate/Grand Order, an online free-to-play role-playing game
Florida Grand Opera, an American opera company
Frost Great Outdoors, an American television network
Film grain overlay, a process in which film emulsion characteristics are overlaid using different levels of opacity onto a digital file